The , signed as Route 2, is one of the radial routes of the Shuto Expressway system in the Tokyo area. Route 2 runs southwest and south from Ichinohashi Junction (with the Inner Circular Route) in Minato-ku and currently ends at a local road (Keihin #2 Road) in Shinagawa-ku. The current length of the highway is 5.9 km. The original expressway plans called for Route 2 to connect to the Keihin #3 Expressway (in Setagaya-ku) but no definite expansion plans have been announced.

Exit list

02
Roads in Tokyo